The Big East Conference Men's Basketball Player of the Year award is given to the men's basketball player in the Big East Conference voted as the top performer by the conference coaches. It was first awarded at the end of the league's inaugural season of 1979–80.

The head coaches of the league's teams (currently 11) submit their votes following the end of the regular season and before the conference's tournament in early March. The coaches cannot vote for their own players.

The award was introduced following the conference's first season in 1980, in which it was presented to John Duren of Georgetown. Patrick Ewing (Georgetown), Richard Hamilton (Connecticut), Troy Bell (Boston College), Troy Murphy (Notre Dame), Kris Dunn (Providence), and Collin Gillespie (Villanova) each won the award twice, while Chris Mullin (St. John's) won three consecutive times from 1983 through 1985. Four award winners have been inducted as players to the Naismith Memorial Basketball Hall of Fame. Ewing, who shared the award in 1984 and 1985 with Mullin, was inducted in 2008 after playing 17 years in the National Basketball Association between 1985 and 2002. Mullin followed in 2011 after a 16-year NBA career (1985–2001). Georgetown's 1992 Player of the Year Alonzo Mourning entered the Hall in 2014 following a 16-year NBA career (1992–2008). The most recent award winner to enter the Hall is Ray Allen from Connecticut,  who won the Big East award in 1996 and went on to a 19-season NBA career (1996–2014), entering the Hall in 2018. There have been eight ties; the most recent instance was among Collin Gillespie and Jeremiah Robinson-Earl of Villanova along with Sandro Mamukelashvili of Seton Hall (2021).

Seven players have been awarded a major national player of the year award in the same year that they received a Big East Player of the Year award. In 1985, Ewing and Mullin shared the conference award, while Ewing was named Naismith College Player of the Year and Mullin was given the John R. Wooden Award. The following year, Walter Berry of St. John's received the Wooden Award and the Big East Player of the Year award. In 1996, Allen received the conference award and was also the final recipient of the UPI Player of the Year Award. In 2004, Connecticut's Emeka Okafor won the conference award while sharing NABC Player of the Year honors with Jameer Nelson of Saint Joseph's. Creighton's Doug McDermott received all major national awards along with the conference award in 2014. Finally, Villanova's Jalen Brunson was the national player of the year as well in 2018.

Georgetown and Villanova are tied for the most winners, as measured by both awards received and individual award winners. For each team, seven players have won eight awards in all. The only current Big East members without a winner are Butler and Xavier, both of which joined the conference at its relaunch following its 2013 split into two leagues, and DePaul, members since 2005.

Key

Winners

Winners by school

Footnotes

See also
Big East Conference Women's Basketball Player of the Year
Big East Conference Men's Basketball Rookie of the Year
Big East Conference Men's Basketball Defensive Player of the Year
Big East Conference Men's Basketball Most Improved Player
List of All-Big East Conference men's basketball teams

References

NCAA Division I men's basketball conference players of the year
Player of the Year
Awards established in 1980